Ryan Francis Quarles (born October 20, 1983) is an American  Republican politician who has served as Agriculture Commissioner of Kentucky since 2016. He served in the Kentucky House of Representatives from 2011 to 2016.

Early life and education
Quarles is a native of Georgetown, Kentucky. He attended Scott County High School and was the valedictorian of the class of 2002. While working on the Quarles family farm, he was an undergraduate triple major (Agriculture Economics, Public Service & Leadership, and Political Science, B.S., '05) and earned masters in Agricultural Economics and in Diplomacy & International Relations ('06) from the nearby University of Kentucky. He graduated summa cum laude with honors. Quarles received a Truman Scholarship, Udall Scholarship, and a scholarship from Toyota. As a Zuckerman Fellow, he was awarded a full-ride scholarship to Harvard University (M.Ed., '09). He also attended the University of Kentucky College of Law (J.D., '10).

Republican Kentucky Governor Ernie Fletcher appointed Quarles to two consecutive terms as a student Council Member on the Kentucky Council on Postsecondary Education. As an undergraduate student, he was Chairman of the College Republicans at the University of Kentucky and that organization's State Political Director in 2004.

Political career

Kentucky House of Representatives

2010 election
Quarles ran in 2010 for the Kentucky House of Representatives for the 62nd District. He won a Republican primary with 60% of the vote.

On October 2, 2010, Quarles was arrested in Lexington, Kentucky, for reckless driving. "A police report said Ryan Quarles, 26, was arrested ... about 3:10 a.m. Saturday. Quarles was driving ... through a parking lot, weaving through cars, the uniform citation said. The report said Quarles showed signs of intoxication and had a blood alcohol level of 0.067 when given a breath test. His blood alcohol level was below the legal limit of 0.08." Quarles pleaded guilty in Fayette District Court, and paid a fine after the charge was lowered to careless driving.

In November 2010, Quarles received 8,508 votes (51%) to incumbent State Representative Charlie Hoffman's 8,287 (49%), winning by 521 votes. In 2011, he was appointed to the  House committees on Agriculture & Small Business, Banking & Insurance, and Education.

2012 and 2014 elections
Quarles ran for a second term in 2012. He again defeated Hoffman, 54% to 46%.

Quarles ran for a third term in 2014. He ran in a district redrawn by the Democratic-controlled House to be more Democratic, drawing in territory which had previously not been part of the district. He was made a top target of the Democrats and his opponent, Charles Tackett, was a Scott County Magistrate. He won by his largest margin of victory, 59% to 41%.

Agriculture Commissioner

2015 election
 
Quarles ran for Kentucky Commissioner of Agriculture in 2015. He won the Republican nomination against fellow State Representative Richard Heath in a very close election, with 92,700 votes (50.39%), versus 91,273 votes (49.61%) for Heath. He had been endorsed by the incumbent Commissioner of Agriculture, James Comer, and defeated Jean-Marie Lawson Spann in the general election.

2019 election and term
 
Quarles ran for a second term in 2019. He won the Republican primary with 82% of the vote (and was the only Kentucky candidate with a primary challenger to win all of Kentucky's 120 counties), and won the general election with 58% of the vote.

In February 2022, he lost the case of Kentucky Hemp Association vs. Quarles, with Kentucky's Boone Circuit Court declaring Delta-8 to be a legal derivative of hemp, and issuing an injunction against Quarles and Kentucky law enforcement preventing them from taking any action against people for selling Delta-8. The lawsuit against Quarles was prompted by the Agriculture Commission having issued an advisory opinion that Delta-8 hemp products were not exempted from the federal controlled substances list, which was followed by Kentucky State Police raiding several lawful hemp retail stores in Kentucky and taking a wide variety of hemp products, money, and cameras, and charging store employees with 
marijuana trafficking.

In June 2022, the Kentucky Attorney General's Office, led by Daniel Cameron, concluded that the Kentucky Department of Agriculture violated Kentucky's open records law by failing to respond to a request for records  related to any litigation involving Quarles, or involving the agriculture department during his tenure, that had been made by the Kentucky Democratic party.

2023 gubernatorial campaign
 
In April 2022, Quarles began a run for the Republican 2023 nomination for Governor of Kentucky. He is running in the primary against a number of Kentucky Republicans, including former U.S. Ambassador to the United Nations Kelly Craft, state Attorney General Daniel Cameron, and state auditor Mike Harmon.

Electoral history

References

External links
Campaign site
Official site
Will Yakowicz (August 11, 2022). "How Kentucky Lost Its War Against Delta-8 THC", Forbes.

1983 births
Harvard Graduate School of Education alumni
Kentucky Commissioners of Agriculture
Living people
21st-century American politicians
Republican Party members of the Kentucky House of Representatives
People from Georgetown, Kentucky
University of Kentucky College of Law alumni